The Atlas Corporation is an American investment firm that was formed in 1928.  Atlas invested in and managed a number of major US companies during the 20th century and has a number of investments in natural resources.

History
Atlas corporation was formed in 1928, in a merger of the United Corporation, an investment firm started in 1923 with $40,000, with Atlas Utilities and Investors Ltd.  The corporation specialized in capital formation and management.  In 1929, Atlas was a $12,550,000 investment trust. The company was able to shrewdly weather the Wall Street Crash of 1929, and continue to grow through the 1930s and 1940s. The corporation was founded by Floyd Odlum and his brother-in-law Boyd Hatch.

With Floyd Odlum as president and Boyd Hatch as vice-president, Atlas invested, managed or controlled numerous industries, including Greyhound Lines, Bonwit Teller (acquired 1934) and Franklin Simon & Co. (acquired 1936) ladies' apparel stores, Madison Square Garden, and various mines, utility companies, aviation related businesses, and banks.  After Atlas Corporation acquired the Bonwit Teller ladies' apparel stores, Floyd Odlum convinced his wife, Hortense Odlum, to become involved in the store's operations. She became the first female president of a major department store chain when she became president of Bonwit Teller in 1934.  In 1948, Howard Hughes acquired controlling interest in RKO Pictures from Atlas.  The Atlas Missile program was named after the Atlas Corporation, the contractor through its Consolidated Vultee Aircraft Corporation, (later Convair) subsidiary, which was used in the Mercury missions to send astronauts into orbit.

Today, the company has ownership in natural resources investments.

References

Financial services companies established in 1928
Investment companies of the United States
Holding companies of the United States
Holding companies established in 1928
American companies established in 1928